Dornala is a village in Prakasam district of the Indian state of Andhra Pradesh. It is the mandal headquarters of Dornala mandal in Markapur revenue division.

Geography 
It is located at  distance to Srisailam the famous jyothirlinga kshetram of 12.

Transport 
The  KG road  passes through the village which connects the towns Kurnool and Guntur.

References 

Villages in Prakasam district
Mandal headquarters in Prakasam district